The 2011 Commonwealth Weightlifting Championships took place at the Good Hope Centre in Cape Town, South Africa from 10 to 14 October 2011. They were held jointly with the 2011 African Championships.

Medal summary
Results shown below are for the senior competition only. Junior and youth results are cited here and here respectively.

Medal table

Men

Women

References

External links
Senior results book
Junior results book
Youth results book

Weightlifting competitions
Weightlifting
Commonwealth Weightlifting Championships
Commonwealth Weightlifting Championships
Commonwealth Weightlifting Championships
International weightlifting competitions hosted by South Africa
Sports competitions in Cape Town
Commonwealth Weightlifting Championships